East Belfast Football Club is a Northern Irish, intermediate football club playing in the Premier Division of the Northern Amateur Football League. The club is based in East Belfast. Long-standing members of the Amateur League, they have been champions of that league nine times, also winning the league's two main knockout tournaments; the Clarence Cup (seven times) and the Border Regiment Cup (three times).

Honours

Intermediate honours
Steel & Sons Cup: 3
1954–55, 1992–93, 2018–19
Northern Amateur League: 9
1949–50, 1952–53, 1953–54, 1954–55, 1955–56, 1962–63, 1963–64, 1965–66, 1993–94
Clarence Cup: 7
1946–47, 1949–50, 1950–51, 1951–52, 1956–57, 2006–07, 2018–19
Border Cup: 3
1950–51, 1952–53, 2015–16

Junior honours
Irish Junior Cup: 1
1943–44

References

External links
 East Belfast FC Official Website
 East Belfast FC Official Blog
 nifootball.co.uk - (For fixtures, results and tables of all Northern Ireland amateur football leagues)

 

Association football clubs in Northern Ireland
Association football clubs established in 1929
Association football clubs in Belfast
Northern Amateur Football League clubs
1929 establishments in Northern Ireland